Battle of Ümera or Battle of Imera, recorded by Henry of Latvia was fought south of Valmiera, near the Gauja River in August or September 1210, during the Livonian Crusade between Crusaders and Estonians. The Estonians won the battle.

The retreating Estonian forces crossed the Gauja River and set up an ambush at its tributary. The pursuing Crusaders believed their enemy was fleeing in haste, something that had been confirmed by their scouts. The vanguard consisted of some 20 knights of the Livonian Brothers of the Sword, led by Landmarschall Arnold. They were followed by Livonians led by Caupo of Turaida, and Latgalians.

The Estonians hiding in the forest around Gauja River charged the enemy unexpectedly. The sudden attack caught the Crusaders off guard. Around hundred Livonians, Latgalians and Germans were captured. The knights tried to regroup around their banner, but as soon as their reinforcements escaped, they too fled the battlefield. The Estonians pursued them and some were captured and killed on the scene. According to the Livonian Chronicle, some of the prisoners were burned alive, while others had crosses carved on their backs with swords, before being executed as well.

A victory over the Brothers of the Sword was a huge morale booster for the Estonians. A message of this feat was sent to all counties with a promise to be as "one heart and one soul against the Christian name".

References

Battles of the Livonian Crusade
Battles involving Estonia
1210 in Europe
Battles involving Livs
Battles involving Letts
Battles involving the Livonian Brothers of the Sword
Battles in Latvia
Vidzeme
Conflicts in 1210